The 1983 Texas A&M Aggies softball team represented Texas A&M University in the 1983 NCAA Division I softball season.  The Aggies were coached by Bob Brock, who led his second season at Texas A&M.  The Aggies finished with a record of 41–11.

The Aggies were invited to the 1983 NCAA Division I softball tournament, where they swept the Central Regional and then completed a run through the Women's College World Series to claim the NCAA Women's College World Series Championship for the first time.  Texas A&M had won the 1982 AIAW Women's College World Series the previous year, and did not participate in the 1982 NCAA Women's College World Series.

Roster

Schedule

References

Texas AandM
Texas A&M Aggies softball seasons
Texas AandM Softball
Women's College World Series seasons
NCAA Division I softball tournament seasons